Deathcamas or death camas refers to several species of flowering plant in the tribe Melanthieae. The name alludes to the great similarity of appearance between these toxic plants, which were formerly classified together in the genus Zigadenus,  and the edible camases (Camassia), with which they also often share habitat. Other common names for these plants include deadly zigadene, hog potato and mystery-grass.

Anticlea elegans – Mountain deathcamas
Anticlea mogollonensis – Mogollon deathcamas
Anticlea vaginata – Sheathed deathcamas
Anticlea virescens – Green deathcamas
Anticlea volcanica – Lava deathcamas
Stenanthium densum – Pinebarren deathcamas 
Toxicoscordion brevibracteatum – Desert deathcamas
Toxicoscordion exaltatum – Giant deathcamas
Toxicoscordion fontanum – Smallflower deathcamas
Toxicoscordion fremontii – Fremont's deathcamas, star zigadene - (several varieties)
Toxicoscordion micranthum – Smallflower deathcamas
Toxicoscordion nuttallii – Nuttall's deathcamas
Toxicoscordion paniculatum – Foothill deathcamas
Toxicoscordion venenosum – Death camas, meadow deathcamas - (several varieties)
Zigadenus glaberrimus, Sandbog deathcamas